The coat of arms of Bern, along with the associated flag and heraldic colours, are used both by the Swiss city of Bern and by the canton of the same name. They were also used by the former district of Bern until its abolition in 2009.

The coat of arms of Bern is on a red field a yellow diagonal band charged with a black bear with a red tongue, claws and penis walking upwards toward the hoist. The heraldic blazon reads: Gules, on a bend or, a bear passant sable, langued, armed and vilené of the field. The flag of Bern is square and depicts the coat of arms. The heraldic colours of Bern are red and black.

Heraldic beast 

The heraldic beast of Bern is the bear. It has long served as namesake, emblem, mascot and — at times — personification of Bern. The founding legend has it that Duke Berthold V of Zähringen vowed to choose as namesake the first animal his hunt met in the wood that was to be chopped down for the new city. Then, as Konrad Justinger's chronicle puts it:
Nu wart des ersten ein ber gevangen, darumb wart die stat bern genempt; und gab do den burgeren in der stat ein wappen und schilt, nemlich einen swarzen bern in einem wissen schilt in gender wise.
Then they caught a bear first, which is why the city was called Bern; and so the citizens had their coat and shield, which was a black bear in a white shield, going upright.

The bear motif is in evidence as early as 1224 (on city seals), and has remained in use ever since. Today the city of Bern still has bears featured directly outside its Altstadt in the Bärengraben.

Coat of arms 

As Justinger's chronicle reveals, Bern's original coat of arms was an upright black bear on a white shield (which is, incidentally, the coat of arms of Berlin). In the 13th century, the coat of arms changed to the one in use today. The modern coat of arms is already recognisable in Alsatian mercenary songs of 1375 reported by Justinger. The change, according to the chroniclers, was linked to the Battle of the Schosshalde in 1289 against the troops of Duke Rudolf II of Austria, son of Emperor Rudolf II von Habsburg. According to Justinger, a Bernese salvaged a part of the ensign as the fortunes of war turned against Bern, and Tschudi recounts:
Und als die von Bern bis ze der zit in ir paner den bern in wijssem veld gefuert, wars damals verendert in ein rot veld, von wegen das die paner ... von bluot was rot worden.
Until then, those of Bern carried the bear in a white field, but the field turned red that day, as the banner was drenched in blood.
The chronicler Stumpf then adds that the diagonal band changed from silver to gold to celebrate the eventual Bernese victory over the House of Habsburg.

As long as Bern still considered itself (at least formally) to be part of the Holy Roman Empire, subject to the Emperor, this was reflected in its coat of arms. The imperial eagle was placed above the Bernese shield, constituting a compound coat of arms known as the Bern-Rych, or "Berne-Empire". Eventually, Bern formally gained the full sovereignty it had long since de facto possessed with the Peace of Westphalia in 1648, but it was not until 1700 that the eagle was replaced with the Republic's trefoil crown that signified ultimate temporal power. This crown is still used by the canton, which places it on top of the coat of arms on its official documents. The city of Bern uses a mural crown on top of its coat of arms, while the district uses no crown.

Other flags of Bern
The war flag of the Ancien Régime, depicting a white cross on black and red flammé, is sometimes flown in lieu of or alongside the state flag.

In vertical flags, the state colours red and black are sometimes used. Yellow is not counted among the state colours.

Adaptations
A flag for the Bernese Oberland, designed by B. v. Rodt, was accepted as official by the Bernese Executive Council in 1953. It consists of a black eagle in a gold field (in reference to the region's old status as reichsfrei) over two fields in the cantonal colours of red and black. As opposed to most other Swiss flags, which are quadratic, the flag's format is specified as "an upright oblong in the proportions of 23 to 26".

The city of New Bern, North Carolina uses almost the same flag, except that its bear does not have a red penis.

See also 

History of Bern
Coat of arms of Berlin: Berlin, Bern's sister capital (of Germany), has a remarkably similar heraldic history.

References

Literature 
Most of this article has been adapted from: Pascal Ladner, Siegel und Heraldik, in: Rainer C. Schwinges (ed.), Berns mutige Zeit: Das 13. und 14.

Footnotes

External links
 Berne at Flags of the World

Bern
Bern
Canton of Bern